Statistics of Kuwaiti Premier League in the 1982–83 season.

Overview
Al Arabi Kuwait won the championship.

References
RSSSF

1982–83
1982–83 in Asian association football leagues
1